Joseph P McLean (born 30 July 1935) is a former British cyclist. He competed in the team pursuit at the 1960 Summer Olympics.

He also represented England in the 4,000 metres individual pursuit, at the 1962 British Empire and Commonwealth Games in Perth, Western Australia. He was also a member of Melling Wheelers and was the British Cycling Federation senior sprint champion.

References

External links
 

1935 births
Living people
British male cyclists
Olympic cyclists of Great Britain
Cyclists at the 1960 Summer Olympics
Sportspeople from Liverpool
Cyclists at the 1962 British Empire and Commonwealth Games
Commonwealth Games competitors for England